Raleigh Holden Brown (December 10, 1921 – May 23, 2009) was from 1963 to 1967 a Democratic member of the Texas House of Representatives who later became a state court judge.

Brown was born in Shreveport in northwestern Louisiana, and reared in Murfreesboro, Tennessee. Brown graduated from law school at Southern Methodist University in Dallas, Texas. He lived most of his life, however, in Abilene, Texas.

Brown served two two-year terms in the Texas House, having been elected in both 1962 and 1964. In 1967, Governor John B. Connally, Jr., appointed him as judge of the 42nd Judicial District. He was elected to a four-year term in 1968. In 1972, he was elected justice to the Texas 11th Court of Appeals in Eastland, east of Abilene, where he remained until retirement in 1986. He then became presiding judge of the 7th Administrative District.

Brown was called into the United States Army while he was working on his undergraduate degree at Middle Tennessee State University in Murfreesboro. He served four years during World War II. In 1944, he came to Abilene when stationed at the former Camp Barkeley. As a reservist, and while working toward his law degree, Brown was subsequently called to serve for nineteen months in the Korean War. He met his wife, Margaret, while he was stationed at Camp Barkeley. The two were married for fifty-nine years until her death in 2007.

Brown was a former president of the Abilene Chamber of Commerce, the Abilene and the Texas State Exchange clubs, the West Texas Rehabilitation Center, and the Abilene Country Club. He was also involved in Goodfellows, Young Men's Christian Association, the City-County Child Welfare Board, Texas Mental Health-Mental Retardation Board, the Abilene Health Foundation, and the Development Corporation Board. He was a board member of the Bank of Commerce and held longtime affiliation with the Texas Bar Association.

Brown died of a heart attack at the age of eighty-seven. Memorial services were held at St. Paul United Methodist Church in Abilene, where Brown was an active member and the former chairman of the administration board. Brown was survived by three daughters, Nancy B. Jennings and husband, Boo, Betsy B. Skorburg and spouse, Dick, and Julie B. Denny and husband, Mike; several grandchildren, and a sister, Bettye B. Smartt of Chattanooga, Tennessee.

References

1921 births
2009 deaths
Democratic Party members of the Texas House of Representatives
Military personnel from Louisiana
Politicians from Shreveport, Louisiana
People from Abilene, Texas
Texas state court judges
Middle Tennessee State University alumni
Southern Methodist University alumni
United States Army personnel of World War II
United States Army personnel of the Korean War
People from Murfreesboro, Tennessee
20th-century American judges
American United Methodists
20th-century American politicians
20th-century Methodists